Altered Beast is the fourth album by alternative rock musician Matthew Sweet. It was released on Zoo Entertainment in 1993.

Recording
Some of the album's guest musicians include: drummers Mick Fleetwood, Jody Stephens, and Pete Thomas; guitarists Richard Lloyd, Robert Quine, and Ivan Julian; keyboardist Nicky Hopkins,; and violinist Byron Berline. The track "Intro" is a clip from the Malcolm McDowell film Caligula.

The title of the album is borrowed from the arcade game Altered Beast. Sweet told Spin magazine that the title meant "whatever is inside you that someday might explode, and maybe you don't know it's there", which he found similar to the game, in which "you have to find these little power-up things, and when you eat them you become the Altered Beast, this other creature that's really powerful and violent". The cover of the album, produced in five different colored versions (yellow, blue, green, orange and purple), features a dinosaur logo. Originally, Sweet wanted to use the logo of the Japanese delivery company Yamato Transport on the cover, but was denied permission; Sweet has described the dinosaur design as a "consolation prize".

Release
Initial responses to the record were mixed, with Rolling Stone writing that it had "inspiring moments; the problem is finding them." AllMusic agreed that the album is "all over the place", yet noted that "it takes a bit of time for all of it to make sense, but after a few listens, it falls together."

Reissue 
In 2018, independent vinyl reissue label Intervention Records announced that it would be releasing Artist-Approved 2 LP Expanded Editions of 100% Fun, Altered Beast, and Girlfriend. The three albums will also be released on CD/SACD. Intervention also announced a first time on vinyl reissue of Son of Altered Beast.

Track listing 
All songs written by Matthew Sweet; with the exception of Track 8, "Intro" excerpts from the movie "Caligula".

 "Dinosaur Act" - 4:05
 "Devil with the Green Eyes" - 4:43
 "The Ugly Truth" - 3:18
 "Time Capsule" - 3:56
 "Someone to Pull the Trigger" - 3:55
 "Knowing People" - 4:25
 "Life Without You" - 2:18
 "Intro" - 0:46
 "Ugly Truth Rock" - 2:58
 "Do It Again" - 3:33
 "In Too Deep" - 3:54
 "Reaching Out" - 4:00
 "Falling" - 4:50
 "What Do You Know?" - 4:27
 "Evergreen" - 4:23 (5:50 track length includes a hidden outro track)

Robert Quine plays lead guitar on Dinosaur Act, Devil With the Green Eyes, Ugly Truth, Time Capsule, Do It Again, Reaching Out, What Do You Know?, and Evergreen.

Richard Lloyd plays lead guitar on Knowing People, Ugly Truth Rock, In Too Deep, and Falling.

Ivan Julian plays lead guitar on Someone to Pull the Trigger and Life Without You.

Music videos 

 *The Ugly Truth", directed by Matthew Sweet
 *Time Capsule", directed by Douglas Gayeton (Satellite Films)

Charts

References 

Matthew Sweet albums
1993 albums
Albums produced by Richard Dashut
Zoo Entertainment (record label) albums
Albums produced by Matthew Sweet